Radio Fréquence Nîmes, founded in 1982 is a French radio station in the town of Nîmes (Gard).

Story 
Radio Fréquence Nîmes known by the diminutive of R.f.n or Radio Nîmes is created in an associative goal. It broadcasts mainly of French song (which she is an advocate) and to a lesser extent Italian and Spanish song and European in general. Radio Fréquence Nîmes, also broadcasts the games of club Nîmes Olympique but only those at home. Today Radio Fréquence Nîmes station (R.F.N) is broadcast on 92.2 FM on Nîmes and its region and also streaming on the official website of the station and also the famous Streaming radio broadcast site TuneIn.

Key Dates 
 1982, Creating Station Wednesday, May 26, 1982, by the founders of Radio Fréquence Nîmes (RFN) Alain Matthieu & Henric Quettelart, better known under the pseudonym Jean Orsi
 2015, October 15, 2015, death of Jean Orsi, in the morning at the age of 74 years .
 2015, October 17, 2015, is the day of the ceremony animators in honor of the creator of Radio Fréquence Nîmes (RFN). 
 Since April 1, 2016, the radio RFN (Radio Fréquence Nîmes), diffused emission The new 3G (Les Grandes Gueules Gard) emissions created by Olivier Jalaguier, with six others quo-founders, Les Grandes Gueles du Gard intended to evoked news Gard department & its region.

Entertainers 
 René Becamel
 Edith Quettelart
 Jean-Pierre Roigt
 Marcel Pont
 Evelyne Paulin
 Lionel Allemand
 Emile Bocquet dit Milou
 Daniel
 Hélène
 Gaby 
 Bruno 
 Patrick

Actual Emissions 
 News of l'(AFP) (Duration 2 minutes) (All Monday's to Friday's every hours start at 7 h to 19 h)
 Musique non stop (All Week and Weekend, start at 19 h to 7 h)
 Chansons Rétros   (All Saturday's, Daniel et Helène, start at 17 h to 18 h)
 Jean-Pierre Roigt (All Tuesday, Jean-Pierre, start at 17 h to 19 h)
 Edith Quettelart (All Wednesday's, Edith, start at 17 h to 19 h)
 Les Grandes Gueules du Gard (All Tuesday's & Friday's start at 11 h 00 to 13 h 00)

Logos

Sources

See also

Connexial Article 
 Nîmes

External links 
 Site de Radio Fréquence Nîmes

Radio stations established in 1982
1982 establishments in France
Radio stations in France